Nevin Karey Shapiro (born April 13, 1969) is a convicted felon who currently is imprisoned for orchestrating a $930 million Ponzi scheme. According to interviews, he engaged in rampant violations of NCAA rules over eight years as a booster for University of Miami athletes. Shapiro allegedly provided football players cash, goods, prostitutes, and assorted favors.

Early life

Shapiro was born in Brooklyn to a Jewish family and moved with his family to Miami Beach, Florida at an early age. He graduated in 1986 from Miami Beach Senior High School. Shapiro, who is 5 feet, 5 inches tall, was a member of the school's basketball and wrestling teams.

Ponzi scheme

Federal criminal allegations
Shapiro started Capitol Investments USA, which he claimed bought wholesale groceries and shipped them to more expensive markets (although he said that he never actually sold the groceries). Shapiro's Ponzi scheme was based on attracting investors to Capitol Investments. He promised investors they would make 10 to 26 percent commissions every month.

In 2003, his business grew very quickly through connections with Sherwin Jarol in Chicago, Craig Currie in New Jersey, and Sydney "Jack" Williams, who had real estate in Naples, Florida and Indianapolis.

According to FBI Special Agent Gregory Yankow in a Federal Criminal Complaint dated April 20, 2010 (Case No. 10-8082), Shapiro "directed others to create and show to the investors documents fraudulently touting Capitol's profitability. Those documents included: financial statements; profit and loss figures fraudulently representing that Capitol's wholesale grocery business was generating tens of millions of dollars in annual sales; personal and business tax returns for Shapiro and Capitol also fraudulently reflecting those sales; and numerous invoices fraudulently reflecting transactions between Capitol and other companies in the wholesale grocery business."

According to the criminal complaint, Shapiro incurred "millions of dollars in debts resulting from illegal gambling on sporting events; more than $400,000 for floor seats to the Miami Heat professional basketball team; approximately $26,000 monthly for mortgage payments on his residence in Miami Beach, which was recently appraised at approximately $5.3 million; approximately $7,250 monthly for payments on a $1.5 million Riviera yacht; approximately $4,700 monthly for the lease of a Mercedes-Benz automobile;" and an undisclosed amount "for a pair of diamond-studded handcuffs, which he gifted to a prominent professional athlete."

The FBI reported that he had diverted $35 million for his personal use from 2005 to 2009. Shapiro allegedly rented his yacht to NBA players Shaquille O'Neal, Dwyane Wade, and Kevin Garnett and pledged $150,000 to the University of Miami to have his name placed on the student lounge.

The scheme fell apart in November 2009 during the late-2000s recession when Chicago real estate investor Sherwin Jarol sued to force him into involuntary bankruptcy after Shapiro had stopped making payments to his investors. More than 60 investors (largely from Naples, Indianapolis, and Chicago), including Barry Alvarez, filed claims (Alvarez had $600,000 in the scheme).

Federal criminal charges
On April 21, 2010, he was charged in New Jersey with securities fraud and money laundering.

Federal plea and sentencing
On September 15, 2010, he pleaded guilty before U.S. District Judge Susan D. Wigenton in Newark, New Jersey in U.S. v. Shapiro, 10-cr-00471 to one count of securities fraud and one count of money laundering. On June 7, 2011, he was sentenced to 20 years in federal prison and ordered to make $82,657,362.29 in restitution.

Home transfer
Shapiro was transferred from federal prison to home confinement on June 11, 2020, where he will continue to serve out the remainder of his 20-year sentence under monitoring by the Federal Bureau of Prisons (BOP). The transfer comes on the heels of recent federal prison directives to move some at-risk inmates to home confinement in the face of COVID-19 outbreaks. The eligibility of Shapiro, who is 51, was aided by having served over 50 percent of his sentence, while also demonstrating hypertrophic cardiomyopathy and hypertension, both of which put him at a higher risk of life-threatening complication if he were to contract coronavirus.

Shapiro was transferred to the home of a family member. He will be monitored electronically by the BOP and subject to a range of BOP guidelines, which include a ban on the consumption of alcohol, random drug testing, and a monitored walking radius near the residence and other criteria. He will also be required to wear an ankle monitor at all times. He will be eligible to hold a job, although any work would require approval through the BOP and his earnings will be garnished to repay remaining restitution to his victims.

The civil case in Miami is Securities and Exchange Commission v. Shapiro, 10-cv-21281.

University of Miami scandal

In August 2010, Shapiro told the Miami Herald that he was writing a book The Real U: 2001 to 2010 Inside the Eye of the Hurricane in which he promised to tell how the University of Miami had violated NCAA rules affecting more than 100 players. "Once the players turned pro, they turned their back on me. It made me feel like a used friend," he said. Shapiro was reported to have spent $2 million from 2002 to 2010 boosting University of Miami sports, primarily football, but also included contact with the basketball team under Frank Haith.

In 2002, he paid $1.5 million for a 30 percent stake in a sports management company called Axcess Sports, started by Michael Huyghue. The agency signed several Miami Hurricanes football players, including Vince Wilfork. 

On August 16, 2011, in a jailhouse interview with Yahoo! sports writer Charles Robinson conducted over 100 hours, Shapiro made good on his promise for revelations, exposing a lack of NCAA-mandated institutional oversight at the university that apparently allowed his illegal and unethical behavior to continue unimpeded for years. To date, 72 University of Miami football players are alleged by Shapiro to have received impermissible benefits from him between 2002 and 2010, including Wilfork, Jon Beason, Antrel Rolle, Devin Hester, Willis McGahee, and the late Sean Taylor.

In response to the allegations, the University of Miami imposed significant penalties on itself, including the suspension of eight football players, and removed itself from post-season bowl contention for one year. On October 22, 2013, after a two-and-a-half year of investigation, the NCAA announced that the University of Miami football team would be docked three scholarships in each of the next three seasons, a three-year probation, recruiting restrictions, a five-game suspension for the Miami Hurricanes men's basketball coach, and a two-year show-cause order on a total of three former assistant football and basketball coaches. Considering such a long investigation yielded very little incriminating evidence, it was widely viewed that the NCAA investigation and the media attention to the case did not match the relatively minor infractions that were proven to be committed. Before the NCAA penalties were announced, it was revealed that NCAA enforcement staff paid Shapiro's lawyer $25,000 to call in University of Miami personnel during an unassociated legal deposition for Shapiro's bankruptcy, and ask a specific list of questions related to the university's scandal.  Shapiro's attorney used her subpoena power in the bankruptcy case to question two witnesses who were crucial to the NCAA's case. The NCAA had no subpoena power, and neither witness had any obligation to talk to the association. The backlash from the revelations about the NCAA's activities, coupled with the university's unprecedented self-imposed sanctions, helped the Miami Hurricanes escape additional harsh NCAA penalties.

Photos in the Yahoo article showed Shapiro with Kellen Winslow Jr. and Joe Kolchinsky in the VIP section of the Opium Garden Nightclub in 2005, with Haith, Joe Kolchinsky and University of Miami President Donna Shalala in 2008 as he donated $50,000 to the basketball program as well as $3 million in other donations to undisclosed recipients, and with Vince Wilfork in 2002.

References

Further reading

21st-century American criminals
American money launderers
20th-century American Jews
American confidence tricksters
Great Recession
Living people
Pyramid and Ponzi schemes
Financial scandals
1969 births
American businesspeople convicted of crimes
People from Lighthouse Point, Florida
People from Brooklyn
21st-century American Jews